: 
Legislative Assembly elections were held in Goa on 14 February 2022 to elect 40 members of the Eighth Goa Legislative Assembly. The votes were counted and the results were  declared on 10 March 2022.

Background
The tenure of Goa Legislative Assembly is scheduled to end on 15 March 2022. The previous assembly elections were held in February 2017 to elect the members of the Seventh Goa Legislative Assembly. After the election, a coalition of Bharatiya Janata Party, Goa Forward Party and Maharashtrawadi Gomantak Party formed the state government, with Manohar Parrikar becoming the Chief Minister.

After the death of Manohar Parrikar, Pramod Sawant was sworn in as the Chief Minister on 19 March 2019.

Election schedule 
The election schedule was announced by the Election Commission of India on 8 January 2022.

Parties and alliances











Others

Candidates
AAP CM candidate Amit Palekar contested from St. Cruz. Former CM and AITC leader Churchill Alemao contested from Benaulim. BJP CM candidate and incumbent CM Pramod Sawant contested from Sanquelim. Former CM and INC leader Digambar Kamat contested from Margao. Former CM  Laxmikant Parsekar contested from Mandrem as an independent candidate after he was denied ticket by BJP.

Campaign

BJP 
BJP has launched a movement to collect suggestions,  ‘Sankalp Peti’ from all across the state to prepare their manifesto for the Assembly Election. The Sankalp Peti, which is flagged off on December 21, will travel across the state till January 5.

INC
INC released its manifesto on 4 February 2022. Some of the key promises made are

 Launching NYAY scheme which promises annual income transfer of rupees 72 thousand to each of the poorest families in the state
 Cap the Petrol and Diesel prices at rupees 80 per litre
 30 percent reservation for women in a government job
 Resumption of mining in a sustainable way
 Congress will resist the three Linear projects and will not allow Goa to become a coal hub
 The Congress will enact a law providing protection to the land rights of locals

AAP 
Arvind Kejriwal gave Guarantees for Goans in his poll campaign based on development and positivity:
Jobs for Goans
1 job per family for unemployed, or ₹3000/month until then
80% private jobs reserved for Goans
₹5000/month for unemployed in tourism due to COVID
₹5000/month for those affected by mining ban
Skill University
Better health infrastructure
Free and Quality education to all 
Form the first corruption free government of Goa

AAP decided to carry out every project with citizen's consent. AAP has also promised to increase the remuneration provided to women in Goa under a state-sponsored scheme and also promised financial assistance to women not covered under it.

AITC 
 Proposed scheme Griha Laxmi Card where ₹5000 will be transferred to a woman in every family of the state. AITC campaign leader Mahua Moitra claimed that 6-8% of total state budget is possible, putting cash in hand and liquidity in system is needed in the depressed situation after COVID-19 pandemic.
 Proposed scheme Yuva Shakti Card which will be a collateral-free pre-approved credit card with a limit up to ₹20 lakh at 4% interest rate to Goan youth in the age group of 18–45 years. This card will allow Goans to take need-based credit for higher education, skill development and starting businesses.
 In proposed scheme  Majhe Ghar, Malki Hak Scheme  AITC has announced that 50,000 such homeless families, who have been living in Goa since 198 or earlier, will be given subsidized housing. Mamata Banerjee's party has also promised to hand over the land lease to the residents within 250 days of the formation of the AITC-MGP coalition government in Goa. A team of 3,000 volunteers will conduct door-to-door surveys after which 50,000 real homeless families will be found.  The AITC-MGP alliance claimed the proposed plan will benefit 80 percent of the residents.
 Proposed scheme Vahan Mitra Scheme offers a subsidy of ₹10,000 for 30,000 taxi drivers and owners.

Poll predictions

Opinion polls

Exit polls 
The Election Commission banned the media from publishing exit polls between 7 AM on 10 February 2022 and 6:30 PM on 7 March 2022. Violation of the directive would be punishable with two years of imprisonment.  Accordingly, these exit polls were published in the evening of 7 March 2022.

Voter turnout 
Source:

Results

Results by alliance and party

Results by district

Results by constituency

Government Formation 
BJP became the single largest party with 20 seats in the hung assembly and decided to take support from 2 independents and MGP.

In September 2022, 8 out of 11 MLAs from Congress joined BJP, increasing the strength of BJP to 28 seats in the Goa Legislative Assembly.

See also

 2022 elections in India
 Elections in Goa

Notes

References

State Assembly elections in Goa
2020s in Goa
Goa